Zoppetti is an Italian surname. Notable people with the surname include:

Alessandro Zoppetti (born 1979), Italian footballer
Cesare Zoppetti (1876–1940), Italian actor
David Zoppetti (born 1962), Swiss writer

Italian-language surnames